Emanuele Spelorzi (born ) is an Italian wheelchair curler.

He participated in the 2006 and 2010 Winter Paralympics where Italian team finished on seventh and fifth places respectively.

Teams

References

External links 

Player profile - FISG - Federazione Italiana Sport del Ghiaccio (Italian Ice Sports Federation)
Profile at the Official Website for the 2010 Winter Paralympics in Vancouver
Emanuele Spelorzi | DISVAL
EmanueleSpelorzi - Scheda persona

Living people
1975 births
Italian male curlers
Italian wheelchair curlers
Paralympic wheelchair curlers of Italy
Wheelchair curlers at the 2006 Winter Paralympics
Wheelchair curlers at the 2010 Winter Paralympics